Crosby High School is a public high school located in the East End section of the city of  Waterbury, Connecticut. It is part of the Waterbury Public Schools district. It was first opened in 1851 and is currently the third oldest high school in Connecticut. It has an enrollment of approximately 1368 students. Originally located at 255 East Main Street in Waterbury, it moved to 300 Pierpont Road in September, 1975. It is attached to Wallace Middle School, in the Edward D. Bergin Educational Park. The principal is Jade L. Gopie, the first African-American principal in the history of the Waterbury Public Schools.

History
When first opened 164 years ago it was called Waterbury High. A fire destroyed Waterbury High building after which a second one opened in 1873 on Elm Street. Crosby High School is named after former Waterbury Superintendent, Minot Sherman Crosby.

Notable alumni

 Caswell Silver, class of 1934, geologist, CEO of Sundance Oil Co.
 Leon Silver, class of 1942, geologist who trained Apollo astronauts in field geology for lunar exploration
 Lisa Nemec, first Croatian long-distance runner to be qualified for the Olympics
 Rick Mastracchio, class of 1978, NASA astronaut
 Jerome Cunningham, #86 Tight end for New York Giants
 Patrick Graham, class of 1997, NFL coach
 Louis Sobol, Broadway columnists

References

External links
 

Schools in Waterbury, Connecticut
Public high schools in Connecticut